Barry Marshall (born 7 March 1948) is a South African cricketer. He played in two first-class matches for Border in 1974/75 and 1975/76.

See also
 List of Border representative cricketers

References

External links
 

1948 births
Living people
South African cricketers
Border cricketers